The 2017–18 I liga (currently named Nice I liga due to sponsorship reasons) was the 10th season of the Polish I liga under its current title, and the 70th season of the second highest division in the Polish football league system since its establishment in 1949. The league is operated by the Polish Football Association (PZPN). The league is contested by 18 teams. The regular season will be played in a round-robin tournament.

Changes from last season
The following teams have changed division since the 2016–17 season.

To I liga
Relegated from Ekstraklasa
 Górnik Łęczna
 Ruch Chorzów
Promoted from II liga
 Raków Częstochowa
 Odra Opole
 Puszcza Niepołomice

From I liga
Promoted to Ekstraklasa
 Sandecja Nowy Sącz
 Górnik Zabrze
Relegated to II liga
 Wisła Puławy
 Znicz Pruszków
 MKS Kluczbork

Team overview

Stadiums and locations

 Stomil Olsztyn intended to play their home games in Ostróda because their home ground (OSiR Stadium) did not fulfill license requirements. On 4 August the club announced that they had received permission to play home games in Olsztyn.

League table

Positions by round

Results

1 Match declared forfeited due to Ruch Chorzów fielding an ineligible player. The game ended in a 2–1 win for Zagłębie Sosnowiec.

I liga play-off
The 15th place team from the regular season will compete in a play-off with the 4th place team from II liga. Matches will be played on 9 and 13 June 2018. The winner will compete in the 2018–19 I liga season.

Garbarnia won 3–2 on aggregate and will play in I liga next season.

Top goalscorers

See also
 2017–18 Ekstraklasa
 2017–18 Polish Cup

References

2017–18 in Polish football
Poland
I liga seasons